Philippe Ginestet (born 15 April 1954) is a French billionaire businessman, and the founder, chairman and owner of GiFi, a French discount chain.

Philippe Ginestet was born on 15 April 1954 in Sainte-Livrade-sur-Lot, Lot-et-Garonne, France.  Ginestet is one of the wealthiest persons in France and one of the largest clothing retailers.

Ginestet founded GiFi, a French discount chain in 1981.  Groupe Philippe Ginestet (GPG) has over 700 stores in France and Belgium.  His son Alexandre Ginestet is the CEO.

Ginestet lives in Pujols, France.

References

Living people
1950s births
French billionaires